Surigaonon may refer to:

 Surigaonon people
 Surigaonon language

Language and nationality disambiguation pages